The biosynthesis of cocaine has long attracted the attention of biochemists and organic chemists.  This interest is partly motivated by the strong physiological effects of cocaine, but a further incentive was the unusual bicyclic structure of the molecule.  The biosynthesis can be viewed as occurring in two phases, one phase leading to the N-methylpyrrolinium ring, which is preserved in the final product.  The second phase incorporates a C4 unit with formation of the bicyclic tropane core.

Biosynthesis of N-methyl-pyrrolinium cation
The biosynthesis begins with L-glutamine, which is derived from L-ornithine in plants.  The roles of L-ornithine and L-arginine was confirmed by Edward Leete.  Ornithine then undergoes a PLP-dependent decarboxylation to form putrescine.  In animals, however, the urea cycle derives putrescine from ornithine.  L-Ornithine is converted to L-arginine, which is then decarboxylated via PLP to form agmatine.  Hydrolysis of the imine derives N-carbamoylputrescine followed with hydrolysis of the urea to form putrescine.  The separate pathways of converting ornithine to putrescine in plants and animals have converged.  A SAM-dependent N-methylation of putrescine gives the N-methylputrescine, which then undergoes oxidative deamination by the action of diamine oxidase to yield the aminoaldehyde, which spontaneously cyclizes to N-methyl-Δ1-pyrrolinium cation.

Beyond its role in cocaine, the N-methyl-pyrrolinium cation is a precursor to nicotine, hygrine, cuscohygrine, and other natural products.

Conversion of N-methyl-pyrrolinium cation to the tropane
The additional carbon atoms required for the synthesis of cocaine are derived from acetyl-CoA, by addition of two acetyl-CoA units to the N-methyl-Δ1-pyrrolinium cation.  The first addition is a Mannich-like reaction with the enolate anion from acetyl-CoA acting as a nucleophile towards the pyrrolinium cation.  The second addition occurs through a Claisen condensation. This produces a racemic mixture of the 2-substituted pyrrolidine, with the retention of the thioester from the Claisen condensation.  In formation of tropinone from racemic ethyl [2,3-13C2]4(Nmethyl-
2-pyrrolidinyl)-3-oxobutanoate there is no preference for either stereoisomer.  In the biosynthesis of cocaine, however, only the (S)-enantiomer can cyclize to form the tropane ring system of cocaine.  The stereoselectivity of this reaction was further investigated through study of prochiral methylene hydrogen discrimination.  This is due to the extra chiral center at C-2.  This process occurs through an oxidation, which regenerates the pyrrolinium cation and formation of an enolate anion, and an intramolecular Mannich reaction.  The tropane ring system undergoes hydrolysis, SAM-dependent methylation, and reduction via NADPH for the formation of methylecgonine.  The benzoyl moiety required for the formation of the cocaine diester is synthesized from phenylalanine via cinnamic acid.  Benzoyl-CoA then combines the two units to form cocaine.

Chemical synthesis
The synthesis and structure elucidation of cocaine was reported by Richard Willstätter in 1898.  Willstätter's synthesis derived cocaine from tropinone.   Robert Robinson and Edward Leete also made significant contributions.

References

Cocaine
Biosynthesis